Iproclozide (trade names Sursum, Sinderesin) is an irreversible and selective monoamine oxidase inhibitor (MAOI) of the hydrazine chemical class that was used as an antidepressant, but has since been discontinued. It has been known to cause fulminant hepatitis and there have been at least three reported fatalities due to administration of the drug.

See also 
 Hydrazine (antidepressant)

References 

Monoamine oxidase inhibitors
Withdrawn drugs
Hepatotoxins
Hydrazides
Phenol ethers
Chloroarenes
Isopropylamino compounds